This is a list of women who are or have been members of the European Parliament for Croatia.

Overview 
In 2013, when Croatia first elected MEPs, 6 of the 12 elected were women.

In November 2018, Biljana Borzan was appointed as the European Parliament's rapporteur on women rights in the Western Balkans in order to help women in Croatia.

At the 2019 European Parliament election, Europe overall was said to have poor gender representation of MEPs elected, in Croatia 6 of the 12 MEPs elected were women.

President of the European Commission, Ursula von der Leyen appointed three women from Balkan countries to her commission as part of scheme to promote women, one of which was Dubravka Suica, to serve as the vice-president for Democracy and Demography.

Croatia uses gender quotas in their elections to the European Parliament, and have been praised for their gender representation among elected politicians.

List of female members of the European Parliament for Croatia

See also 
 Women in Croatia

Further reading 
 Women In The European Parliament - Official material from the European Parliament

References

External links 

Lists of Members of the European Parliament for Croatia
Women MEPs for Croatia
Lists of women Members of the European Parliament